The Sotra Bridge is a suspension bridge which crosses Knarreviksundet between Knarrevik in Øygarden Municipality and Drotningsvik on the mainland of Bergen Municipality in Vestland county, Norway. It carries two road lanes and two narrow pedestrian paths of National Road 555, providing a fixed link for the archipelago of Sotra. In 2007, it had an average 25,494 vehicles per day.

The bridge was brought into use on 11 December 1971, although not officially opened until 1972. It cost 40 million Norwegian krone (NOK) to build, of which NOK 23.5 million was paid for with tolls, which were collected until 1983. When it opened, it was the longest suspension bridge in Norway, but is now the seventh longest. There exist plans to build a second bridge to either expand the road to four lanes, or carry a proposed extension of the Bergen Light Rail. Alternatively, a subsea tunnel could be built to carry a motorway.

Specifications

The concrete bridge crosses Knarreviksundet, which separates the island of Litlesotra, part of the Sotra archipelago, from the mainland and Bergen. The western part of the bridge, on Sotra, lies in Knarrevik in Fjell, while the eastern part lies in Drotningsvik in Bergen. In 2009, it had an annual average daily traffic of 25,494 vehicles. Because it is located across the sound, the bridge is vulnerable to winds from the north and south. It is closed whenever the wind speed exceeds .

History

Planning
The first discussion of a bridge in a public forum was in 1954, when Anton P. Torsvik proposed a bridge to the major and municipal engineer of Fjell. Torsvik lived in Oslo and had worked with public relations for various other bridge projects. The issue was discussed in the municipal councils of Fjell and Sund, but they both concluded that there were more pressing needs on the islands' road network, so they did not want to prioritize a bridge. National Road 555 was completed in 1957, and the following years various road projects were completed.

Another person who took up the initiative in the late 1950s was Rangvald Iversen, who was plant manager at Norwegian Talc at Knarrevik. The plant had large costs freighting their products across the sound on the Alvøy–Brattholmen Ferry. In 1958, he took the initiative to conduct a traffic count, which along with estimates of increased traffic from other places that had replaced a ferry with a bridge, would give estimates for the revenue from tolls. Norwegian Talc also paid for a draft plan for a bridge. In 1959, Iversen presented an estimate that a bridge would cost NOK 15.5 million, and on 19 December 1959, the council voted unanimously to recommend that a committee be established to continue work on the bridge plans. In 1960, the bridge was included in the road plan for Hordaland.

There were also some plans for the future which would remove the last ferries within the Sotra and Øygarden archipelagos, meaning that the entire twin archipelago would have ferry-free access to the mainland, should the Sotra Bridge be built. The plans had been spurred by a large decrease in fishing during the late 1950s, and the need for increased tax revenue from new industries. The framework for the plan started in 1961 with the creation of an inter-municipal cooperation, which in 1964 resulted in the merger of the municipalities of Hjelme and Herdla to create Øygarden. On 8 May 1962, an inter-municipal road committee was established, which recommended that a limited company be established to finance the bridge. In Bergen, Bro og Tunnelselskapet had similarly built the Puddefjord Bridge and Eidsvåg Tunnel, and the inter-municipal council recommended a similar model. However, they wanted a separate company for Sotra and Øygarden, so extra tolls could be used to help finance road projects on the archipelago.

On 29 June 1962, Fjell Municipality sent an official application to the County Governor to start planning, and this was sent onwards to the Directorate for Public Roads. They concluded that it would be possible to finance the bridge with tolls collected over 13 to 14 years, with the state paying for one-third of the bridge.

In 1962, the extra costs for the higher height were estimated at NOK 4 million. Bergen City Council voted in favor of the shortest proposal. The Royal Norwegian Navy supported a taller bridge, but were more willing to reduce the height than the port authority.

It was the Ministry of Fisheries and Coastal Affairs who had the final word in the matter. A national committee was established in 1963 to make guidelines for clearances, and it recommended that  be used in fjords and sounds where very large ships, in particular cruise ships, would pass, while  would permissible for minor and inner parts of fjords, as well as passages where alternatives were available. For ships from the east, the distance would be the same, while from the north they would not pass through the sound. The port authority stated on 11 November 1963 that they were willing to allow a smaller clearance, which was back up by Bergen City Council on 27 November.

Financing and construction

On 2 January 1965, the bridge committee recommended that a limited company be established to finance the bridge. The three archipelago municipalities, Fjell, Sund and Øygarden, would purchase shares for NOK 500,000, while another NOK 200,000 would be purchased from the mainland municipalities and Hordaland County Municipality. The company was established as A/S Sotrabrua on 16 October 1965, with the head office located in Fjell. The company was given authority by its owners to apply for a 20-year concession to collect tolls on a new bridge; if the tolls gave a profit beyond covering the debt of the bridge, it was to be used for further construction of roads on Sotra and Øygarden. The company was formally registered on 12 January 1966.

To get satisfactory conditions for the loan, the company was recommended by banks to increase the ownership equity to 10% of the loan. The share capital was insufficient, so the company started issuing preferred shares to individuals and the companies, and managed to secure NOK 1.7 million. An exception to the rules was made, and the company was allowed to start detailed planning before the loans had been finalized. An estimate from 1966 showed that the bridge itself would cost NOK 27 million, while the auxiliary roads would cost NOK 4 million, excluding inflation and interest during construction. On 23 November 1966, the county council supported a proposal that one third of the construction costs be covered by national road funds. On 10 August 1967, the Ministry of Finance and the Bank of Norway gave permission that the company could borrow up to NOK 25 million. The loan was a bond sold by Bergens Privatbank and Samvirke Forsikring, consisting of one series valued at NOK 15 million issued in 1968, and one valued at NOK 10 million issued in 1970, with an interest of 5.5% and 6.0%, respectively. There was a five years interest-only period, followed by ten years of repayment. The mortgage deed was secured in the right to collect tolls, supported by guarantees from the municipalities of Bergen, Fjell, Sund and Øygarden, and the county municipality. In addition, the company was granted loans from Bergens Privatbank, Bergens Sparebank and Vestlandsbanken for NOK 3 million, although these were never used. The state's part of the financing was through a loan from the Regional Development Fund.

The bridge was approved by the Parliament of Norway on 5 June 1968. An agreement regarding financing was made between A/S Sotrabrua and the Ministry of Transport and Communications on 1 July 1968. The construction of the road would be done by Hordaland Public Road Administration, who would receive two-thirds of the financing of costs up to NOK 34 million from the company. The company would also advance the state's part of the costs, which would be repaid to the company as NOK 1 million per year, for an estimated advance of NOK 8.3 million. The company would be responsible for any interest, including that which would be accumulated during construction, and would have the right to collect tolls on all traffic on the bridge.

The optimal crossing point ran over Norwegian Talc's plant, and would involve placing the western pylon in the middle of their area. The company offered the authorities free land on the condition that they received a satisfactory intersection with the bridge. A formal agreement was reached in mid-1970. On the eastern side, an area development plan had to be made, which was approved on 19 May 1967. The necessary land not already owned by the municipalities was expropriated.

Initial plans had called for the bridge to be completed by October 1972. On 28 December 1968, the company asked the road administration if construction could be quickened. They estimated that the bridge could be completed by December 1971 for a price increase of NOK 750,000. This gave the company NOK 2 million more in profits, as it could more quickly start collecting toll revenue. The company chose to accept this extra cost. The start of construction was delayed, first by the parliamentary decision coming right before the holidays, followed immediately by a national strike by engineers. The contract for the foundation and concrete work was won by Selmer, who started work in March 1969. The steel-work contracts were issued to Høsveis, Bofa and Alfred Andersen; despite them not having the lowest bid, the road administration chose to use the largest companies.

On 11 December 1971, the bridge opened for traffic, and on the same day, the Alvøy–Brattholmen Ferry was terminated. In February 1972, there were twice as many cars as there had been on the ferry in February 1971. The official opening by King Olav V took place on 25 May 1972. The bridge cost NOK 39.8 million to construct. This included NOK 650,000 for the county road between Knarrevik and Brattholmen, which had been paid for by the state. The cost the company had to pay was NOK 23.45 million. The final estimates for the project were for NOK 34 million, and the whole cost above this was covered by the state. When it opened, the bridge was the longest in Norway.

Tolls and auxiliary projects
Since the bridge would be the only road from the mainland to the archipelago, tolls could be collected in only one direction. The tolls were set to NOK 40 for semitrailers, NOK 30 for buses, NOK 20 for trucks, NOK 12 for cars, NOK 5 for motorcycles, NOK 4 for bicycles, NOK 2 for adults and 1 for children. Discounts were available at the same rates as for ferries. The four people who had worked the longest on the ferry were offered the job as toll plaza employees. From 1972, the bookkeeping of the company was transferred from the company's secretary to Bergens Privatbank's branch in Sotra, while the auditing was placed at Hordaland County Auditing.

In 1972, the company collected NOK 3.07 million in tolls, 21% more than estimated. By 1977, the annual income had reached NOK 5.03 million, which was up 28% from the estimates. From 1978, the tolls for people were removed, resulting in about NOK 1 million less revenue per year. One of the reasons for the removal of passenger tolls was the extra time used to count passengers, which increased the queues at the toll plaza, and that the company's debt would be covered anyway, even without the extra revenue. From 1 January 1981, scheduled buses were also exempt from tolls, under the condition that the funds saved were used by the bus companies to strengthen public transport on Sotra. From 1980, there was disagreement within the company as to whether the toll period should be extended to increase the subsidies to projects on Sotra and Øygarden, or if an as short as possible collection period was desirable. The board decided to terminate toll collections from 31 December 1983. A minority of the owners wanted to extend the period for another two years, which would have given an estimated additional NOK 20 million.

The company collected NOK 73.5 million in tolls, in addition to accumulating NOK 16.3 million in interest. Costs, mostly for running of the toll plaza, were NOK 7.6 million, in addition to financial costs of NOK 20.0 million. This gave a profit of NOK 62.4 million, including the necessary repayments of the initial loan. Because the debt had been financed with bonds, the company chose to place revenue in the bank with a higher interest instead of paying off the bonds faster. The preferred shares were repaid in 1980, while all bonds had been repaid by 1985. A/S Sotrabrua was formally liquidated on 9 February 1989.

Among the company's other goals was that of helping finance road projects on Øygarden. The most pressing issue was the section from Kolltveit on Store Sotra to the bridge, part of National Road 555. In 1976, the company issued NOK 5 million in an interest-free loan to the project, which was repaid in 1982 and 1983. Similar conditions were imposed for NOK 2 million for National Road 561 to Nordra Straumsundet and NOK 1.2 million for the establishment of the Solsvik–Rong Ferry in 1974. The rest of the subsidies were given as grants. The main project was National Road 561, which ran from Kollveit northwards through Øygarden, for which the company paid NOK 28.6 million. It paid a further NOK 9.3 million for other projects in Sotra and Øygarden, including connections to Turøy and Misje.

Future

In 2005, 8,000 people commuted between Sotra and Bergen, and the bridge had an average daily traffic of 22,000 vehicles. On National Road 555 between Straume, the municipal center of Fjell, and Storavatnet, where National Road 555 becomes a motorway, there are long queues during rush hour. The Norwegian Public Roads Administration has proposed a four-lane motorway along National Road 555 from Stoavatnet to Straume. This will require a new crossing across Knarreviksundet. Such a motorway extension is estimated to cost between NOK 3 and 4 billion, and the government has allocated NOK 400 million in National Transport Plan 2010–2019 for the project. It is presumed that most of the project will be financed as a toll road.

Four main proposals were suggested for the new fixed link. One involved a four-lane subsea tunnel, one involved building a second, two-lane bridge immediately adjacent to the current one, which would give the impression of a single bridge, another involved a new four-lane bridge slightly to the south, and the last involved a new bridge considerably further to the south, which would connect to County Road 557.

A tunnel would consist of two sections, one from Kolltveit to Arefjord, where there would be an intersection, and one from Arefjord to Storavatnet. This would involve the current National Road 555 being reclassified as a local road. A tunnel would be  longer than a bridge, which would give higher costs of roughly NOK 1000 per year for an average commuter. The tunnel would catch long-distance travel (Straume and westwards), while the bridge would be used for local traffic.

The company Sotrasambandet AS has been established to lobby for and potentially debt-finance the construction, which potentially could include other parts of National Roads 555 and 561. In 2008, the company estimated that it might be possible to start construction in 2013, and complete the project by 2016. On 21 April 2009, State Secretary Geir Pollestad stated that the government would support a bridge, but did not indicate if a two-lane or four-lane solution would be chosen. The Norwegian Public Roads Administration has recommended a four-lane bridge, while the Institute of Transport Economics has recommended the two-lane bridge. It is largely up to the city councils of Bergen and Fjell to determine which of the bridge alternatives will be chosen.

A four-lane bridge is estimated to cost NOK 2 billion. It could either be located immediately north of the current bridge, or south of Norwegian Talc. The traffic from Askøy, along County Road 562, connects with National Road 555 at Storavatnet. Without a bypass, the increased capacity from Sotra would not be achieved without expanding the motorway from Storavatnet to the city center. In 2010, an alternative was launched whereby a four-lane bridge would be built south of Norwegian Talc, and would immediately run into a tunnel and connect to the current motorway at Liavatnet. This is the planned intersection between National Road 555 and County Road 557 (Ring Road West), which would result in traffic from Sotra towards southern Bergen would not take up capacity on the current 555 motorway until after traffic from both Sotra and Askøy heading towards southern Bergen have had a possibility to head onto County Road 557.

In June 2010, Hordaland County Council decided that an extension of the Bergen Light Rail to Sotra was to be made part of the extension plans in the period until 2040. For the light rail to use existing infrastructure, a bridge would have to be chosen. The road project has been criticized by environmentalists because it uniformly bases growth in transport to the archipelago based on cars, and lacks any plans for inclusion of public transport, whether by light rail or as bus lanes. Criticism has also been raised against the Norwegian Public Roads Administration being responsible for planning the public transport, as they have failed to produce efficient public transport systems in Bergen.

References

Bibliography
 
 
 

Suspension bridges in Norway
Norwegian National Road 555
Bridges completed in 1971
1971 establishments in Norway
Road bridges in Vestland
Road bridges in Bergen
Øygarden
Former toll bridges in Norway